The James W. and Ida G. Bowman House is a historic building located in Marion, Iowa, United States. The Bowmans hired the Cedar Rapids architectural firm of Dieman & Fiske, and specifically partner Charles Dieman, to design this two-story wood-frame house that combines American Craftsman and Prairie School influences. Local contractor Charles I. Wilson completed construction in 1910 in a neighborhood populated by prominent citizens. The wide overhanging eaves with exposed rafter ends reflects the Craftsman style, while the square massing and horizontal emphasis of the siding and roofline of the porch are typical of the Prairie School style. The house was individually listed on the National Register of Historic Places in 2002. At the same time it was included as a contributing property in the Pucker Street Historic District.

References

Houses completed in 1910
American Craftsman architecture in Iowa
Houses in Marion, Iowa
National Register of Historic Places in Linn County, Iowa
Houses on the National Register of Historic Places in Iowa
Individually listed contributing properties to historic districts on the National Register in Iowa